Horishnyi is a Ukrainian surname. It means top, upper or located on the top.

It may refer to:

 Vasyl Horishnyi, a Ukrainian politician, communist, member of Verkhovna Rada

References

Ukrainian-language surnames